Too Big to Fail: The Inside Story of How Wall Street and Washington Fought to Save the Financial System—and Themselves, also known as Too Big to Fail: Inside the Battle to Save Wall Street, is a non-fiction book by Andrew Ross Sorkin chronicling the events of the 2008 financial crisis and the collapse of Lehman Brothers from the point of view of Wall Street CEOs and US government regulators. The book was released on October 20, 2009, by Viking Press.

It won the 2010 Gerald Loeb Award for Best Business Book, and was shortlisted for the 2010 Samuel Johnson Prize and the 2010 Financial Times and Goldman Sachs Business Book of the Year Award.

The book was adapted in 2011 for the HBO television movie Too Big to Fail.

Plot summary
The book provides an overview of the financial crisis of 2007–08 from the beginning of 2008 to the decision to create the Troubled Asset Relief Program (TARP). The book tells the story from the perspectives of the leaders of the major financial institutions and the main regulatory authorities, describing in a very detailed manner their everyday discussions and decisions during that difficult period.

Awards
 2010 Gerald Loeb Award
 Shortlist 2010 Samuel Johnson Prize
 Shortlist 2010 Financial Times and Goldman Sachs Business Book of the Year Award

See also 
 Great Recession in the United States
 Too big to fail

References

External links
 Andrew Ross Sorkin's website
 
 Book of Revelation on economist.com
 Paulson Bangs Heads, Fuld Rages in Sorkin Tick-Tock of Meltdown on bloomberg.com
 Rational Irrationality on nytimes.com

2009 non-fiction books
American political books
Non-fiction books adapted into films
Finance books
Viking Press books
Non-fiction books about the Great Recession